Calvoliella is a genus of mites in the family Acaridae.

Species
 Calvoliella laphriae (Samsinak, 1956)
 Calvoliella pocsi Samsinak, 1969

References

Acaridae